Manny Elias (born 21 February 1953) is an Indian drummer and record producer of British descent. He is notable for being the original drummer with Tears for Fears during the 1980s.

Originally a member of the rock band Interview from Bathford, Somerset, Elias began working with Tears for Fears in 1981 and drummed on the albums The Hurting and Songs from the Big Chair, as well as participating in their subsequent tours. Elias is credited as an official member of Tears for Fears on those two albums, and appears in six of the band's promotional videos from that era. In addition to that, he has co-writing credits on "The Way You Are" and "The Working Hour".

Since parting ways with Tears for Fears in 1986, Elias has provided percussion on albums from such artists as Peter Gabriel, Peter Hammill and Julian Lennon. He was also a member of The Believers, a band that included Gary Tibbs and Andy Skelton, and which released one album in 1992.

See also
Neon
Roland Orzabal
Curt Smith
Ian Stanley
List of bands from Bristol

References

External links
[ Interview at Allmusic]
Discography at Discogs.com
Interviewtheband.com
Daniel Silverman review

1953 births
Living people
musicians from Kolkata
English rock drummers
Tears for Fears members
English record producers
Neon (British band) members